"Eternally" is a song by Japanese musician Hikaru Utada, from their 2001 album Distance. It was re-arranged in 2008 as "Eternally (Drama Mix)" for use in the Maki Horikita starring Fuji TV drama Innocent Love. It was released as a digital single on October 31, 2008, and eventually released onto CD in March 2009, on an EMI compilation album .

Innocent Love director Toshiyuki Nakano originally decided that Utada's voice would suit the themes of the drama well. Hearing "Eternally", he felt the song was a perfect choice for the drama, as the song's melody, lyrics and title fitted, in his opinion, as if the song had been specifically commissioned for the drama.

Writing
The song is a R&B ballad featuring an arrangement of strings, background percussion and guitar. The lyrics describe a person addressing their lover, describing how much they treasure a single moment they are sharing with this person. They believe that even if they cannot stay with their lover forever, at least .

The drama mix of the song features a different take of Utada's vocals during the recording sessions of Distance in 2001, however it was given a new mix in 2008. The new version is very similar in structure to the original, however with more prominent strings during the chorus.

Charts

Certifications

Release history

References

2001 songs
Japanese television drama theme songs
Hikaru Utada songs
Songs written by Hikaru Utada